Hey Boy may refer to:

Film
 Hey Boy (film), a 1948 Italian film
 Hey Boy (character), a character in the TV show Have Gun - Will Travel

Music

Songs
 "Hey Boy" (Teddybears song), later covered by Polish group Blog 27 as "Hey Boy (Get Your Ass Up)"
 "Hey Boy" (Take That song)
 "Hey Boy!" (Kim-Lian song)
 "Hey Boy" (Sia song), 2020 single
 "Hey Boy", a song by Heidi Montag from the album Superficial
 "Hey Boy", a song by the Blow from the album Poor Aim: Love Songs
 "Hey Boy", a song by The Spiders (Japanese band)
 "Hey Boy", a song by Celeste (singer)
 "Hey Boy", a song by Brenda & the Tabulations
 "Hey Boy", a song by Lesley Duncan, 1966
 "Hey Boy", a song by Barry St. John
 "Hey Boy", a song by Magic Kids, 2009
 "Hey Boy", a song by Paul London (singer)
 "Hey Boy", a song by Tina Charles (singer)
 "Hey Boy Hey Girl", a single released by the Chemical Brothers